Henri Bonneaud (1907 – 2 March 1957) was a New Caledonian businessman and politician.

Biography
An established businessman, Bonneaud served as director of Établissements Ballande, and was vice-president of the Nouméa Chamber of Commerce.

After World War II Bonneaud entered politics. He was elected to the General Council for the Union Party (also known as the Ballande Party) in the 1945 elections. He soon became leader of the party, and on 15 November 1947 he became President of the General Council, a role he held until 1952.

He died on 2 March 1957 whilst on a visit to Paris to protest against the Loi-cadre, which would have given equal voting rights to  Kanaks.

References

1907 births
New Caledonian businesspeople
Presidents of the Congress of New Caledonia
1957 deaths